Andrew Gregory Chafin (born June 17, 1990), nicknamed "Big Country" and "The Sheriff", is an American professional baseball pitcher for the Arizona Diamondbacks of Major League Baseball (MLB). He has previously played in MLB for the Chicago Cubs, Oakland Athletics and Detroit Tigers.

Amateur career
Chafin is from Wakeman, Ohio. He attended Western Reserve High School in Collins, Ohio, and played for the school's baseball team. He pitched a no-hitter in his final high school game.

Chafin attended Kent State University, and played college baseball for the Kent State Golden Flashes. As a freshman in 2009, he was the Mid-American Conference Freshman of the Year after he had a 1.26 earned run average (ERA), eight saves and 55 strikeouts over  innings pitched. In 2010, he underwent Tommy John surgery and missed the 2010 season. He returned in 2011 as a starter and had a 2.02 ERA with 105 strikeouts over 89 innings. After the 2011 season, he played collegiate summer baseball with the Orleans Firebirds of the Cape Cod Baseball League.

Professional career

Arizona Diamondbacks
The Arizona Diamondbacks selected Chafin in the first round with the 43rd overall selection of the 2011 Major League Baseball draft. He made his professional debut for the Arizona League Diamondbacks, pitching in one game, recording two strikeouts over one inning. He started the 2013 season with Visalia and was promoted to the Mobile BayBears during the season.

Chafin made his Major League debut on August 13, 2014, against the Cleveland Indians at Progressive Field, going 5 innings allowing three hits, two walks, and three strikeouts, earning a no-decision. In his second  start and first Major League at-bat on September 17, 2014, for the Arizona Diamondbacks, he hit a single and got an RBI.

Chafin was converted into a reliever for the 2015 season, a season in which he finished 5–1 with a 2.76 ERA in 66 games for the D'Backs. The following season, just like the majority of the pitching staff, Chafin struggled throughout the season, appearing in 32 games with a 6.75 ERA. He bounced back the following season, being used now as a situational left hander out of the bullpen. In 71 games, he had a 3.51 ERA for the D'Backs. In 2018, Chafin was continued to be used as a situational lefty out of the bullpen, pitching  innings. His record was 1–6 in a career high 77 games. In 2019, Chafin appeared in 77 games for the second consecutive season, finishing with a record of 2–2 in  innings. The following season with the new 3 batter rule, Chafin wasn't used solely as a left handed specialist and he struggled during the first half of the season with the team. He was 1–1 with a career worst 8.10 ERA in  innings.

Chicago Cubs
Chafin was traded to the Chicago Cubs on August 31, 2020, the trade deadline of the shortened season, in exchange for Ronny Simon. Chafin pitched to a 3.00 ERA in 4 games with the Cubs to finish the year. On February 2, 2021, Chafin re-signed with the Cubs on a one-year, $2.25 million contract that included a mutual option for 2022. On June 24, 2021, Chafin pitched a combined no-hitter against the Los Angeles Dodgers along with Zach Davies, Ryan Tepera, and Craig Kimbrel. In 43 appearances for the Cubs in 2021, Chafin recorded a 2.06 ERA with 37 strikeouts in  innings of work.

Oakland Athletics
On July 27, 2021, the Cubs traded Chafin to the Oakland Athletics in exchange for Greg Deichmann and Daniel Palencia. Between the two teams in 2021, Chafin pitched in 71 games, boasting a 1.83 ERA and 64 strikeouts in  innings.

Detroit Tigers
On March 17, 2022, Chafin signed a two-year, $13 million contract with the Detroit Tigers. On April 6 (retroactive to April 4), the Tigers placed Chafin on the 10-day injured list with a left groin strain. He made 64 appearances for the 2022 Tigers, posting 3 saves and a 2.83 ERA, with 67 strikeouts in  innings.

Chafin opted out of the second year of his Tigers contract on November 6, 2022, making him a free agent.

Arizona Diamondbacks (second stint)
On February 15, 2023, Chafin signed a one-year contract with the Arizona Diamondbacks.

Pitch selection
Chafin throws a four-seam fastball and a two-seam sinking fastball that each average 92 to 94 MPH (topping out at 97 MPH). His main offspeed pitch is a mid-80s slider.

Personal life
Chafin and his wife, Shelbi, have two daughters and live on a farm near Massillon, Ohio.

References

External links

Kent State Golden Flash bio

1990 births
Living people
People from Wakeman, Ohio
People from Kettering, Ohio
Baseball players from Ohio
Major League Baseball pitchers
Arizona Diamondbacks players
Chicago Cubs players
Oakland Athletics players
Detroit Tigers players
Kent State Golden Flashes baseball players
Orleans Firebirds players
Arizona League Diamondbacks players
Visalia Rawhide players
Mobile BayBears players
Salt River Rafters players
Reno Aces players
Lakeland Flying Tigers players
Toledo Mud Hens players